The 2016 Triangle Torch season was the first season for the American indoor football franchise, and their first in American Indoor Football.

Schedule
Key:

Regular season
All start times are local to home team

Standings

Roster

References

Triangle Torch
Triangle Torch
American football in North Carolina